Chiranjivi are the eight immortals who are to remain alive on Earth until the end of the current Kali Yuga, according to Hinduism. The Sanskrit term Chiranjivi means “immortal”, even though it does not correspond with “eternal”. The term is a combination of "chiram" (forever) and jivi (lived).

Etymology and scriptural context
The term is a combination of chiram, or 'permanent', and jīvi, or 'lived'. It is similar to amaratva, which refers to true immortality. At the end of the last Manvantara, a demon attempted to become immortal by swallowing the sacred pages of  Vedas, as they escaped from the mouth of Brahma. The scripture was retrieved by the first avatar (Matsya) of Vishnu. Incarnations of Vishnu (Narasimha and Rama) also later fought and killed two asuras, Hiranyakasipu and Ravana, who tried to become immortal through obeisance to Brahma and Shiva, respectively. In one sense immortal can mean "to live eternally until the destruction of universes", i.e., all physical bodies are foretold to become immaterial at the end of time, along with the Brahma himself, with the destruction of the universe.

Attributes
The extant Puranas, the Ramayana, and the Mahabharata describe seven long-lived personalities in the Hindu pantheon. There are others as well, which are not included in the one particular shloka. Each represents a different attribute of man, which as long as they live, will exist amongst humanity.

The eight Chiranjivis
Vyasa: The sage who composed the Mahabharata. He represents erudition and wisdom. He is the son of sage Parashara and Satyavati, a fisherwoman. He is also the great-grandson of the sage Vashishtha. He was born towards the end of Dvapara Yuga, and saw the initial phase of Kali Yuga.
Hanuman: One of the greatest brahmachari, he served Rama. He is the most ardent vanara devotee of Rama. He stands for selflessness, courage, devotion, intelligence, strength, celibacy and righteous conduct.
Parashurama: The sixth avatar of Vishnu. He is knowledgeable in all astras, shastras, and divine weapons. The Kalki Purana writes that he will reemerge at the end of time to be the martial guru of Kalki. He will then instruct the final avatar to undertake penance to receive celestial weaponry, required to save mankind during the end times.
Vibhishana: The brother of Ravana. Vibhishana defected to Rama before his battle with Ravana. He was later crowned the King of Lanka after Ravana was killed by Rama. He stands for righteousness. Vibhishana is not a true Chiranjivi, as his boon of longevity is to remain on the earth only until the end of the Maha Yuga.
Ashwatthama: The son of Drona. Drona performed many years of severe penance to please Shiva in order to obtain a son who possessed the same valor as the deity. Ashwatthama is the avatar of one of the eleven Rudras. Kripa and he are believed to be the lone survivors still living who had fought in the Kurukshetra War. He is immortal, but Krishna bestowed upon him a curse that "he would live forever but with his body covered with painful sores and ulcers that would never be cured". 
Mahabali: The ruler of the asuras, he is still revered in present-day Kerala. His son was Banasura. He was the virtuous emperor of the three worlds and son of Virochana, and grandson of Prahlada, who were also of asura descent. He was exiled to the Patalaloka (the underworld) by the Vamana avatar of Vishnu to restore cosmic order. Every year, on the day of Onam (a major festival of Kerala), he is held in popular tradition to descend upon the earth from the heavens to visit his people.
Kripa: The royal guru of the princes in the Mahabharata. He was adopted by King Shantanu. His sister was Kripi, who married Dronacharya. He was blessed with long life because of impartiality among his students, and because he treated them as his own children. He, along with his nephew Ashwatthama, are the lone survivors of all warriors who actually fought in the Kurukshetra War.
Markandeya: Markandeya is an ancient rishi born in the clan of Bhrigu. The eponymous Markandeya Purana comprises a dialogue between Markandeya and a sage called Jaimini, and a number of chapters in the Bhagavata Purana are dedicated to his conversations and prayers. He is also mentioned in the Mahabharata.

Literature

The Sapta Chiranjivi Stotram is a mantra that is featured in Hindu literature:

The mantra states that the remembrance of the eight immortals (Ashwatthama, Mahabali, Vyasa, Hanuman, Vibhishana, Kripa, Parashurama, and Markandaya) offers one freedom from ailments and longevity.

References

External links
Ciranjivas

 
[[Category:Non-human races i n india God hanuma